SAKO (PL: System Automatycznego Kodowania Operacji - EN: Automatic Operation Encoding System) is a Polish language-based programming language written for the computers XYZ, ZAM-2, ZAM-21 and ZAM-41.

Hello world
 K) PROGRAM DRUKUJE NAPIS HELLO WORLD
    LINIA
    TEKST:
    HELLO WORLD
    KONIEC

References 
 Prace Zakładu Aparatów Matematycznych PAN, "System Automatycznego Kodowania SAKO – opis języka", PAN – Warszawa 1961,
 Leon Łukaszewicz, Antoni Mazurkiewicz "System automatycznego kodowania SAKO" Zakład Narodowy im. Ossolińskich, Polish Academy of Sciences Publishing House, Wrocław-Warszawa-Kraków 1966 r.

Non-English-based programming languages
Science and technology in Poland